The 2018 FIVB Beach Volleyball World Tour was the global elite professional beach volleyball circuit organized by the Fédération Internationale de Volleyball (FIVB) for the 2018 beach volleyball season. Starts in September 2017 after the end of the year season, the 2018 FIVB Beach Volleyball World Tour Calendar comprised three FIVB World Tour 5-star tournaments, eight 4-star, six 3-star, seven 2-star, twenty-two 1-star events and the World Tour Finals, all organised by the FIVB.

Schedule
Key

Men

Women

Medal table by country

References

External links
2018 FIVB Beach Volleyball World Tour at FIVB.org
Swatch Major Series official website

 

World Tour
2018